Moni Kumar Subba (16 March 1958 – 27 May 2019) was a member of the 12th Lok Sabha, 13th Lok Sabha and 14th Lok Sabha of India from 1998 to 2009. He represented the Tezpur constituency of Assam and was a member of the Indian National Congress (INC) political party. He died due to heart and brain stroke attack in Artemis Hospital New Delhi, on 27 May 2019.

Identity scandal
In 2007, the Central Bureau of Investigation told the Supreme Court of India that Subba's nationality was in doubt, and that existing citizenship proofs were forged. However, the court rejected a petition seeking his disqualification from the Parliamentary election, stating that the court "cannot unseat legislators".
Before moving to Assam, M. K. Subba stayed in Sikkim for a while, where he is alleged to have come from Nepal. In Sikkim he is alleged to have run a chit fund company, then moved to Assam. In between he partnered in a 5 star Casino hotel The Royal Plaza in Gangtok, Sikkim, which after his death has some property dispute going on.

References

External links
 Home Page on the Parliament of India's Website
CNN-IBN Investigation

1958 births
2019 deaths
Indian National Congress politicians
India MPs 2004–2009
India MPs 1999–2004
India MPs 1998–1999
Lok Sabha members from Assam
People from Darjeeling
Indian Gorkhas
Limbu people